The Hong Kong Premier League is a Hong Kong professional football league organised by the Hong Kong Football Association. It is currently sponsored by BOC Life and officially known as BOC Life Hong Kong Premier League. The inaugural season began in September 2014. It is the top-division football league in Hong Kong.

History
On 7 February 2013, the Hong Kong Football Association stated that the new Premier League would get under way in Autumn 2014, where it was suggested that the 2013–14 season would be a transition year. As a result, the 2013–14 Hong Kong First Division League was the last season of the First Division to be the top tier of football in the Hong Kong league system.

The clubs already in the top division initially reacted negatively to the perceived increased running costs of competing in a professional league, particularly one where some felt that there was little difference to the old First Division. Five clubs – Citizen, Southern, Sun Hei, Happy Valley and Tuen Mun all eventually decided against joining the new league, which led to fears that the HKFA's plan to start the league with a minimum of 8 teams would not be possible. In the end, however, through public funding and government support, two teams from the Hong Kong Second Division were able to meet the new league licence requirements and were promoted, making a total of 9 teams for the first season.

With the recent completion of 'Project Phoenix' which started in 2011, the league has seen some improvements with further amendments planned for the future. This includes a new five-year funding agreement, a new licensing scheme for league member clubs, prize money for all participating teams and new measures put in place against corruption and match-fixing.

Kitchee were crowned as champions of the inaugural season, after amassing a total of 36 points in the league with only 2 losses. Tai Po finished bottom of the league with only 7 points.

The following season, Eastern won the league with a game to spare, winning their first top flight championship in 20 years. They also created history, as they were the first team in the world to win a top flight men's title whilst being managed by a female coach. Wong Tai Sin were relegated after finishing last in the league.

In the 2016–17 season, Kitchee reclaimed the title on the final day of the season in a showdown with rivals Eastern, a game which they won 4–1. Eastern later won the End-of-Season playoffs and will therefore also compete along with Kitchee in the 2018 AFC Champions League. HKFC finished bottom of the table, and were thus automatically relegated to the First Division.

Kitchee successfully defended their title in 2017–18, becoming the first club to repeat as champions the following year.

In the 2018–19 season, Tai Po won the league, becoming the first district team to win a top flight title since Yuen Long in 1962–63.

Due to the COVID-19 pandemic, the 2021–22 season was curtailed and ultimately cancelled, with the championship withheld: this was the first time a top flight league season had been cancelled since the Second World War.

Format
The first season kicked off in September 2014, with 9 teams competing for the championship. It was initially suggested that a relegation system would not apply for the first few seasons, and that teams would continue to be promoted to the top-tier league until there were 12 member clubs. In the end, however, the HKFA decided that one club would be relegated and one club would be promoted from the 2014–15 Hong Kong First Division League.

By 2016–17, the league had expanded to 11 teams. The HKFA promoted Tai Po and HKFC who had finished at the top of the 2015–16 Hong Kong First Division into the league while adding expansion teams Hong Kong Sapling and R&F. Wong Tai Sin were relegated from the previous season and Metro Gallery chose to self relegate due to financial difficulties.

For the 2017–18 season, the league moved down to ten teams after Hong Kong's most successful and longest running top flight club South China chose to relegate themselves to the First Division in a shock move after the departure of their chairman, and them failing to find suitable financial means to keep the club in the Premier League. HKFC were also relegated after finishing bottom of the table.

The champions of the league qualify for the 2nd qualifying round of the AFC Champions League, while the champions of the Hong Kong FA Cup qualify for the playoff round of the AFC Cup. Should the league champions fail to qualify for the Champions League, they will instead receive Hong Kong's East Asia Zone group stage slot in the AFC Cup. Previously the FA Cup winners and the teams finishing in 2nd, 3rd and 4th competed in an end of season playoff for the final spot in the AFC Champions League, but this format was abolished after the 2016–17 season.

Reserve League
Each Hong Kong Premier League team form their own reserve team which competes in the Hong Kong Reserve Division League.

Prize money

The structure of the prize money for the inaugural season is as below.

Clubs 
As of August 2022, a total of 10 teams currently participate in the Hong Kong Premier League.

Yellow denotes a newly promoted club entering the league this year.

Timeline

Stadiums
Primary venues used in the Hong Kong Premier League:

Champions

Wins by club

Media coverage
Live matches and highlights shows are provided free of charge through online website Facebook and Youtube in Cantonese.

With regards to English coverage, the official Hong Kong Football Association website, and to a lesser extent the South China Morning Post, provide match reports, player interviews, club information and league data. The Hong Kong Football Podcast also covers the HKPL on a fortnightly basis.

Other tournaments
Domestic tournaments
Hong Kong Senior Shield (1896–present)
Hong Kong FA Cup (1975–present)
Hong Kong Sapling Cup (2015–present)
Hong Kong League Cup (2000–2012, 2014–2016)
Hong Kong Community Cup (2014–present)
Hong Kong Reserve Division League (1956–present)

Continental tournaments
AFC Champions League
AFC Cup

References

External links
 
 Hong Kong Premier League at Soccerway

 
1
Top level football leagues in Asia
Sports leagues established in 2014
2014 establishments in Hong Kong